Hesham Shaban (born August 8, 1980) is a Libyan football defender currently playing for Al-Ittihad. Shaban has been a member of the Libya national football team. In 2008, Shaban appeared five times for the Libya national team in the 2010 FIFA World Cup qualifying rounds, scoring in a 4–0 win over Lesotho. He played in the 2009 African Nations Championship and scored for the winning team in the final of the Libyan Cup 2008–09.

References

External links
 

1980 births
Living people
Libyan footballers
Libya international footballers
Association football forwards
Al-Ittihad Club (Tripoli) players
People from Tripoli, Libya
Libyan Premier League players